Boucader Diallo (born 14 September 1984) is a Malian football player.

Career
Diallo began his career with Stade Malien. In December 2008, he signed a 4-year transfer contract with Sudanese side Al-Merreikh.

International career
He was part of the Mali squad at the 2001 FIFA U-17 World Championship and the U-20 team who finished third in group stage of 2003 FIFA World Youth Championship. He was part of the Malian 2004 Olympic football team, who exited in the quarter finals, finishing top of group A, but losing to Italy in the next round.

References

External links

1984 births
Living people
Malian footballers
Mali international footballers
Mali under-20 international footballers
Olympic footballers of Mali
Footballers at the 2004 Summer Olympics
Expatriate footballers in Sudan
Malian expatriate sportspeople in Sudan
Stade Malien players
Al-Merrikh SC players
Association football defenders
21st-century Malian people